The Abas River, was a river of Iberia in Asia, mentioned by Plutarch (Plut. Pomp. 35) and Dio Cassius (37.3) as crossed by Pompey, on his expedition into the Caucasian regions. Its course was east of the Cambyses (likely the modern Iori); and it seems to be the same as the "Alazonius" or "Alazon" of Strabo and Pliny which fell into the Cambyses just above its confluence with the Cyrus (modern Kura). Thus, likely the modern Alazani River. The Battle of the Abas was fought on a plain adjacent to the river in 65 BCE.

References

Rivers of Asia
Rivers of Europe
Classical geography